Northside Speedway is a speedway venue on the west side of the A596, north of Workington.

The venue his the home of the Workington Comets who moved to the site for the 2023 National Development League speedway season. The site was previously a speedway training track but was developed during 2021 to enable league racing. The speedway side, under the control of local businessman Andrew Bain, were set to enter to 2022 National Development League speedway season but a series of vandalism incidents at the circuit pushed back the intended opening date.

See also 
Workington Comets

References

Sport in Cumbria
Buildings and structures in Cumbria
Workington
Sports venues completed in 2022
Sports venues in Cumbria